Pine Hollow Reservoir is an impoundment of water from Threemile and Pine Hollow creeks on the east flank of the Cascade Range in Wasco County, Oregon, United States. Public access and fishing are permitted along most of the  shoreline of the reservoir.

Managed jointly by the Oregon Department of Fish and Wildlife (ODFW) and the irrigation district, the reservoir is adjacent to year-round and vacation homes, a census-designated place called Pine Hollow, but is accessible to the public via a  easement bought by the ODFW. The lake has two public boat ramps and a private resort with a campground, boat rentals, and a general store. Fish species that thrive in the reservoir include rainbow trout, brown bullheads, largemouth bass, and bluegills.

See also 
 List of lakes in Oregon

References

Reservoirs in Oregon
Lakes of Wasco County, Oregon